Cystolith (Gr. "cavity" and "stone") is a botanical term for outgrowths of the epidermal cell wall, usually of calcium carbonate, formed in a cellulose matrix in special cells called lithocysts, generally in the leaf of plants.

Cystoliths are present in certain families, including in many genera of Acanthaceae. Plants in the family Urticaceae, known as stinging nettles, also form leaf cystoliths, but only during their later flowering and seed setting stages. Other examples include Cannabis and other plants in the family Cannabaceae, which produce leaf and flower cystoliths, and Ficus elastica, the Indian rubber plant of the family Moraceae. 

From a 1987 article on cystolith development and structure:

References

Cell anatomy
Plant anatomy